Murder Creek may refer to:

Murder Creek (Alabama)
Murder Creek (Georgia)